Sage's Complete Markets was a privately held supermarket chain, based in San Bernardino, California, consisting of 7 stores located throughout Southern California. It was founded in San Bernardino, California, in 1937, by Milton R. Sage. Milton R. Sage opens his first market at Base Line and E Street in 1937. The store will expand to become a chain of Sage's Complete Markets throughout San Bernardino and Riverside Counties. The company had 16 separate stores, including six supermarkets, six adjacent toy stores, Two "Minute" Shops (Rialto and San Bernardino), and two Bakeries. On side of the buildings were Sage's Coffee Shop and Sage's Toy Stores. Sage's filed for bankruptcy on  May 19, 1972, in early 1973 all stores were closed. Milton R. Sage died of a heart attack on November 22, 1973 at the age of 64.

Stores

In 1937 Sage's Opened a Farmers Market at Baseline and E Street with 5 employees including himself. In 1939 the store was renamed Food King Market. In 1945 the current building at Baseline and E Street was remodeled with adjacent parking and a nursery. The Baseline store was remodeled and expanded in 1958 and 1961, Closed in Dec 1972.

On July 8, 1948, Sage, purchased six markets in San Bernardino, Colton, and Riverside. Three were bought from Lewis Markets, and three from Fitzsimmons Tower Markets.

November 17, 1948, Opened its second Sages's store in downtown San Bernardino, next to the Harris Department Store at 262 E Street. Simultaneously with another opening at Twelfth and Main Street in Riverside.

Sages Del Rosa 1630 Highland Ave in San Bernardino on December 3, 1956

Sages Redlands, 450 Cypress  Redlands November 1, 1959

 Sages Magnolia 6491 Magnolia Ave Riverside 1951 remodeled in 1962

Sages Sierra Way and Highland in San Bernardino, Grand Opening was on September 5, 1963.  Six store acquisition of the former Food Giant Market on July 28, 1963.  Closed in 1972

Sages Rialto at 250 W. Foothill Blvd. Rialto opened in July 1964

Sages 12th and Main store, relocated to 5222 Arlington Riverside in 1964

Stater Bros. Chairman Jack Brown served as Vice President-Sales and Merchandising for Sage's Complete Markets in San Bernardino. Brown died in 2016.

References

1937 establishments in California
American companies established in 1937
Companies based in San Bernardino County, California
Privately held companies based in California
Retail companies established in 1937
Supermarkets based in California
Supermarkets of the United States
San Bernardino, California
Riverside, California
Redlands, California
Rialto, California
Defunct supermarkets of the United States